The King of the Neighborhood (El rey del barrio) is a 1950 Mexican comedy film directed by Gilberto Martínez Solares.

Synopsis 
Tin Tan is a highly popular inhabitant of his neighborhood, where he has a faithful band of followers. He's trying to woo Carmelita, the prettiest girl there, and the many mishaps that happen while doing this.

Cast
Germán Valdés - Tin Tan
Silvia Pinal - Carmelita
Marcelo Chávez - Policía
Fannie Kauffman - La Nena
Juan García - El Peralvillo
Yolanda Montes - Herself
Ramón Valdés - El Norteño

External links 

1950 films
1950 comedy films
1950s Spanish-language films
Mexican comedy films
Mexican black-and-white films
1950s Mexican films